Clifford Winter (1884 – 27 October 1918) was a professional footballer who played as an inside left in the Football League for Gainsborough Trinity.

Personal life 
Winter served as a corporal in the Cameronians (Scottish Rifles) during the First World War and died of wounds at the Battle of Cambrai on 27 October 1918. He is buried in Rocquigny-Equancourt Road British Cemetery, Manancourt.

References 

English footballers
Newcastle United F.C. players
English Football League players
Association football inside forwards
British Army personnel of World War I
1884 births
1918 deaths
Gainsborough Trinity F.C. players
Gateshead A.F.C. players
British military personnel killed in World War I
Cameronians soldiers
Footballers from Gateshead
Burials at Rocquigny-Equancourt Road British Cemetery